Oleh Shandruk (born 30 January 1983, Smyha, Rivne Oblast, Ukrainian SSR) is a retired Ukrainian football defender and manager.

External links 

Stats on Odessa Football website

Ukrainian footballers
1983 births
Living people
Ukrainian Premier League players
FC Arsenal Kyiv players
FC Chornomorets Odesa players
FC Shakhtar Donetsk players
FC Volyn Lutsk players
FC Sevastopol players
NK Veres Rivne managers
Association football defenders
Ukrainian football managers
Sportspeople from Rivne Oblast